Novaya Yunost (Новая Юность, New Youth) is a Russian literary magazine. It was founded in 1993. The founding chief editor was Alexander Tkachenko, who had previously been poetry editor of Novaya Yunost's predecessor Yunost. The headquarters of Novaya Yunost is in Moscow.

References

External links
 Details at index of Russian magazines. (Russian)

1993 establishments in Russia
Literary magazines published in Russia
Magazines established in 1993
Magazines published in Moscow
Russian-language magazines